Rainbow Quest (1981–2007) was an American-bred, British-trained Thoroughbred racehorse and Champion broodmare sire.

Background
Rainbow Quest was a bay horse with two white socks and a small white star bred in Kentucky by British businessman, Alan Clore.  He was sired by Blushing Groom out of the mare I Will Follow.

Racing career

1983: two-year-old season
Rainbow Quest began his racing career at Newmarket Racecourse in August 1983 when he defeated twenty-nine opponents in the El Capistrano Stakes. In the following month, he beat nineteen rivals in the Haynes, Hanson and Clark Conditions Stakes over one mile at Newbury Racecourse. In October, Rainbow Quest was matched against El Gran Senor, Siberian Express (winner of the Prix Morny), and Superlative (July Stakes) in the Dewhurst Stakes at Newmarket. El Gran Senor took a lead in the closing stages, but Rainbow Quest cut his advantage back to half a length at the line. In the 1983 International Classification, Rainbow Quest was rated the second best two-year-old in Europe, one pound behind El Gran Senor.

1984: three-year-old season
On his three-year-old debut Rainbow Quest was beaten a short-head by Lear Fan in the Craven Stakes and then finished fourth behind El Gran Senor, Chief Singer, and Lear Fan in the 2000 Guineas. He was then diverted from The Derby to the Prix du Jockey Club, in which he finished third behind Darshaan and Sadler's Wells. He was then sent to Ireland, where he finished second in the Irish Derby, beaten a length by El Gran Senor. In August, Rainbow Quest returned to England and recorded a victory in the Great Voltigeur Stakes. On his final appearance of the season, he contested the Prix de l'Arc de Triomphe at Longcamp in October. He was made favourite for the race by British bookmakers but finished eighteenth of the twenty-two runners behind Sagace.

1985: four-year-old season
Rainbow Quest began his third season with an easy win in the Clive Graham Stakes at Goodwood Racecourse in May. He then ran in the Coronation Cup at Epsom Downs Racecourse and recorded a win from Old Country. In July, Rainbow Quest finished second to Pebbles in the Eclipse Stakes and third behind Petoski and Oh So Sharp in the King George VI and Queen Elizabeth Stakes. On his final appearance, he ran for the second time in the Prix de l'Arc de Triomphe. He finished a neck behind Sagace but was awarded the race when French horse was disqualified for causing interference.

Stud record
Riviera Red, from Rainbow Quest's 2000 crop, was a moderate racehorse, but attracted some attention when he was the equine model for the proposed White Horse at Ebbsfleet statue.

As a result of irreparable complications following surgery for colic, Rainbow Quest was euthanized  on July 7, 2007 at Juddmonte's Banstead Manor Stud near the village of Cheveley in East Cambridgeshire.

Major winners
c = colt, f = filly, g = gelding

Broodmare sire
Rainbow Quest was the Leading broodmare sire in Great Britain & Ireland in 2003 and 2004. Among his daughters' top runners were:
 Rebelline (b. 1998) – won G1 Tattersalls Gold Cup
 Marotta (b. 1999) – won G1 Prix Saint-Alary
 Rakti (b. 1999) – won G1s: Derby Italiano, Premio Presidente della Repubblica, Champion Stakes, Prince of Wales's Stakes, Lockinge Stakes 
 Kris Kin (b. 2000) – won Epsom Derby
 Powerscourt (b. 2000) – won G1 Tattersalls Gold Cup, Arlington Million
 North Light (b. 2001) – won Epsom Derby 
 Footstepsinthesand (b. 2002) – won 2,000 Guineas Stakes
 Look Here (b. 2005) – won Epsom Oaks
 Elusive Wave (b. 2006) – won G1 Poule d'Essai des Pouliches
 Auroras Encore (b. 2002)- won Grand National

Pedigree

References

 Rainbow Quest's pedigree and partial racing stats
 Rainbow Quest in Designing Speed in the Racehorse (p. 176, 177) by Ken McLean at Google Books

1981 racehorse births
2007 racehorse deaths
Arc winners
British Champion Thoroughbred broodmare sires
Chefs-de-Race
Racehorses bred in Kentucky
Racehorses trained in the United Kingdom
Thoroughbred family 14-f